Lola Martinez is a weather anchor on CNN International. She was born in Barcelona, grew up in England and is based at the CNN Center in Atlanta, Georgia.

Martinez studied English and Spanish Literature at the University of Barcelona. She received her master's degree in Theater, Speech and Film from the University of South Carolina.

Martinez joined CNN after anchoring weather forecasts in both English and Spanish for The Weather Channel.

External links
Lola Martinez profile on CNN.com

Weather presenters
University of South Carolina alumni
University of Barcelona alumni
Living people
People from Barcelona
CNN people
Year of birth missing (living people)